The Mistress Is Served (Italian: La padrona è servita, German: Die Herrenreiterin) is a 1976 Italian-West German comedy drama film directed by Mario Lanfranchi and starring Senta Berger, Maurizio Arena, and Bruno Zanin.

It was shot at the RPA - Elios Studios in Rome and on location in Guastalla in Emilia-Romagna.

Cast
 Senta Berger as Angela / mother 
 Maurizio Arena as Domenico / Angela's second husband 
 Bruno Zanin as Daniele / Domenico's son 
 Erika Blanc as Olga / Angela's daughter 
 Barbara Nascimben as Claudia / Angela's daughter 
 Barbara Vittoria Calori as Sultana / Angela's daughter 
 Pina Cei as Fanny / Countess -Angela's mother-in-law 
 Angiolina Quinterno as Lina / maid 
 Luigi Casalini
 Bruno Lanzarini
 Patricia Weber
 Renzo Bianconi
 Patrizia De Clara

References

Bibliography 
 Bock, Hans-Michael & Bergfelder, Tim. The Concise CineGraph. Encyclopedia of German Cinema. Berghahn Books, 2009.

External links 
 

1976 films
Italian comedy-drama films
West German films
German comedy-drama films
1976 comedy-drama films
1970s Italian-language films
Films directed by Mario Lanfranchi
Films scored by Stelvio Cipriani
1976 comedy films
1976 drama films
1970s Italian films
1970s German films